Joshua Harry Keener (August, 1871 – March 25, 1912) was a Major League Baseball pitcher who played for the 1896 Philadelphia Phillies.

External links

1871 births
1912 deaths
Major League Baseball pitchers
Baseball players from Pennsylvania
Philadelphia Phillies players
19th-century baseball players
Allentown Kelly's Killers players
Altoona Mad Turtles players
Hazleton Barons players
Hazleton Quay-kers players
Philadelphia Athletics (minor league) players
Wilmington Peaches players
Columbus Senators players
Detroit Tigers (Western League) players
Allentown Peanuts players
Jersey City Skeeters players
Harrisburg Ponies players